Jonilson Veloso Santos (born 30 May 1975) is a Brazilian football manager, currently in charge of Jacuipense.

He is the uncle of international footballer Dante.

References

External links
 

1975 births
Living people
People from Salvador, Bahia
Brazilian football managers
Campeonato Brasileiro Série C managers
Campeonato Brasileiro Série D managers
Esporte Clube Jacuipense managers
Sociedade Esportiva do Gama managers
Sportspeople from Salvador, Bahia